Ek Boond Ishq ( A Drop of Love) is an  Indian television drama show which premiered on 9 September 2013 on Life OK. The show stars Viraf Patel and Chhavi Pandey in lead roles.

Plot
Tara (Chhavi Pandey) is a happy go lucky girl who supports her family of  her widowed mother Aradhana, elder sister Nandini, and younger brother Bunty by running a food cart. One day, while being troubled by some miscreants, she enters a temple and interrupts the worship of a mysterious powerful eunuch, Kalavati (Vishwajeet Pradhan). Then she had sudden marriage with Mrityunjay Singh Shekhawat (Viraf Patel) at jail convinced by his father Jairaj Singh Shekhawat due to her financial condition. Mrityunjay was accused of rape and murder of a girl. After this both Tara and Mrityunjay's life has changed drastically. The change was good or bad that is the story of 'Ek Boond Ishq'.

Cast
 Viraf Patel as Mrityunjay Singh Shekhawat
 Chhavi Pandey as Tara Singh Shekhawat
 Vishwajeet Pradhan as Thakur Rudra Pratap / Kalavati  
 Gauri Tonk as Nirmala Singh Shekhawat
 Rakesh Kukreti as Thakur Jairaj Singh
 Nida Chakraborty as Vasu Singh Shekhawat
 Dishank Arora as Aditya Singh Shekhawat
 Nidhi Uttam as Meethi Singh Shekhawat
 Aarna Sharma as Pari Shekhawat
 Hunar Hali as Nandini
 Shahab Khan as Govind Shukla
 Geeta Tyagi as Aradhana
 Ravi Gossain as Fahim
 Shresth Kumar as Yug
 Rohit Saraf as Bunty
 Priyal Gor / Aanchal Munjal as Radha Verma
 Zohaib Siddiqui as Vedant Nanda
 Ankur Nayyar as Omkar Agnihotri
 Priya Bathija as Mannat Agnihotri
 Prithvi Zutshi as Ranveer Singh Shekhawat

References

External links
 on Hotstar
 

Life OK original programming
Indian drama television series
Indian television soap operas
2013 Indian television series debuts
2014 Indian television series endings